Niina Maria Onerva Malm (born 3 May 1982, in Imatra) is a Finnish politician currently serving in the Parliament of Finland for the Social Democratic Party of Finland at the South-Eastern Finland constituency.

References

1982 births
Living people
People from Imatra
Social Democratic Party of Finland politicians
Members of the Parliament of Finland (2019–23)
21st-century Finnish women politicians
Women members of the Parliament of Finland